Osica may refer to several places in Romania:

Osica de Jos, a commune in Olt County
Osica de Sus, a commune in Olt County